Konstantin Yakovlevich Lifschitz (born 10 December 1976 in Kharkov) is a Russian pianist of Jewish descent.

Career 

At the age of five Lifschitz came to the Gnessin Specialized Music School in Moscow. Tatiana Zelikman was his most important teacher. When he was 13 he gave his first recital at the House of the Unions (Moscow) that was greeted with enthusiasm. At the final exam (1994) he played the Goldberg Variations, Gaspard de la nuit and works by Alexander Nikolayevich Scriabin. His other teachers were Teodor Gutman, Vladimir Tropp, Karl Ulrich Schnabel, Fou Ts'ong, Alfred Brendel, Leon Fleischer, Rosalyn Tureck, Hamish Milne and Charles Rosen. Lifschitz did not participate in any piano contests.

After the Perestroika he started to give concerts in major European cities. Among the orchestras he played with are I Solisti Veneti, MDR Leipzig Radio Symphony Orchestra, Academy of St Martin in the Fields, Staatsphilharmonie Rheinland-Pfalz, Konzerthausorchester Berlin, Mozarteum Orchestra Salzburg, Minnesota Orchestra, Bern Symphony Orchestra, London Symphony Orchestra, Chicago Symphony Orchestra, New York Philharmonic, Saint Petersburg Philharmonic Orchestra. Conductors were Andrey Boreyko, Bernard Haitink, Eliahu Inbal, Marek Janowski, Michail Jurowski, Eri Klas, Fabio Luisi, Neville Marriner, Claudio Scimone, Yuri Temirkanov, Dietrich Fischer-Dieskau, Mstislav Rostropovich.

Konstantin Lifschitz is giving masterclasses all around the world. Since 2008 he has an own class at the Lucerne University of Applied Sciences and Arts. He lives near Lucerne.

He performs or performed chamber music with string quartets and soloists as Gidon Kremer, Dmitry Sitkovetsky, Patricia Kopatchinskaja, Leila Josefowicz, Mischa Maisky, Lynn Harrell, Carolin Widmann, Bella Davidovich, Valery Afanassiev, Natalia Gutman, Jörg Widmann, Sol Gabetta, Alexei Volodin, Daishin Kashimoto, Maxim Vengerov, Mstislav Rostropovich (died 2007) and Eugene Ugorski (born 1989).

Lifschitz conducts orchestras and the Gabrieli Choir.

Orchestra
 St. Christopher Chamber Orchestra Vilnius
 Philharmonic Chamber Orchestra Wernigerode
 Chamber Orchestra Arpeggione Hohenems
 Dalarna Sinfonietta Falun
 Lux Aeterna Budapest
 I Solisti di Napoli
 Neujahrskonzert Langnau in Emmental
 Stuttgart Chamber Orchestra
 Copenhagen Philharmonic
 Moscow Virtuosi
 Century Orchestra Osaka

Selected Reviews 
 Konstantin Lifschitz – review, The Guardian, 2011
 Konstantin Lifschitz – review, The Independent, 2007
 Bach’s Songs of Innocence and Experience, All in a Day, NY Times, 2007
 Schubert Piano works/Lifschitz/Palexa C

Festivals
 Rheingau Musik Festival
 Miami International Piano Festival
 Lucerne Festival
 Schleswig-Holstein Musik Festival
 Bodenseefestival
 White Nights Festival, St. Petersburg
 George Enescu Festival, Bucharest
 Newport Music Festival
 Sommerliche Musiktage Hitzacker
 Tivoli Festival Copenhagen
 Les Nuits Pianistiques Festival, Aix-en-Provence
 SoNoRo International Chamber Music Festival, Bukarest

Recordings 
The pianist has released 39 recordings to date. A full list can be found on his website
Johann Sebastian Bach and Peter Seabourne: Toccatas and Fantasies .  Johann Sebastian Bach  Toccatas BWV 910-916 and Peter Seabourne Steps Volume 6: Toccatas and Fantasias (Willowhayne Records, 2022)
Ludwig van Beethoven: 32 Sonatas (Alpha Classics - ALPHA584, 2020)
Maurice Ravel, Claude Debussy, Igor Stravinsky, Jakov Jakoulov: Daphnis et Chloé (Orfeo – C905162A, 2016)
Johann Sebastian Bach: Goldberg Variationen BWV 988 (Orfeo – C864141A, 2015)
Gottfried von Einem: Concerto op. 20 with Rundfunk-Symphonieorchester Wien, conductor Cornelius Meister (Orfeo - C8828112A, 2008)

Dedications 
 Peter Seabourne, Steps Volume 6: Toccatas and Fantasias
 James Bolle, Piano Concert
 Vladimir Ryabov, 4 Chromatic Studies
 Jakov Jacoulov, Carrousel
 Boris Yoffe, Humble Muse
 Rahel Senn, Song of a Magnolia
 Denis Burstein, Variations
 Inna Zhvanetskaya, Dance-Suite (Partita)
 Nimrod Borenstein, Melancholic Mobile (No. 3 from Reminiscences of Childhood)
 Colette Mourey, Eaux-Fortes, No. 6: Une promenade (spirituelle) à Rome

Prizes 
 Echo (music award) Best International Newcomer (1995) for the Debut Recording
 Grammy Award Nomination (1996) For the Goldberg Variations Recording
 Associate, later Fellow of the Royal Academy of Music (2003)
 Rowenna Prize of the Reed Kostellow Fund (New York) (2006)
 Holy Sergius of Radonezh Order (Moskau) (2007)

References

External links
  Biography at Musical America

Russian pianists
Living people
1976 births
Musicians from Kharkiv
21st-century pianists